Innus of Ekuanitshit (French: Les Innus d'Ekuanitshit) are a First Nation band in Quebec, Canada. They live primarily in the Indian reserve of Mingan on the north coast of the St Lawrence River. , the band had a registered population of 677 members.

Demographics 
Members of the band of Ekuanitshit are Innus. , the Nation had a total registered population of 677 members, of which 54 lived off reserve. According to the 2016 Canadian Census, the median age of the population is 24.9 years old.

Geography 
Innus of Ekuanitshit has only one reserve, Mingan, also called Ekuanitshit, where the band is headquartered and where lived the majority of its members. The closest important city is Sept-Îles.

Governance 
Innus of Ekuanitshit are governed by a band council elected according to a custom electoral system based on Section 11 of the Indian Act. For the 2018 to 2021 tenure, this council is composed of the chief Jean-Charles Piétacho and four councillors.

Languages 
The language spoken by the Innus is Innu-aimun, a language of the Cree-Innu-Naskapi dialect continuum of the Algonquian languages family. According to the 2016 Canadian Census, 95.4% of the Innus of Ekuanitshit have an Aboriginal language has the first language learned and 100% know an Aboriginal language and speak it at home. With respect to official languages, 6.4% know both, 88.1% know only French and 0% know only English.

See also 
 Mingan, Quebec
 Innu
 First Nations

References

External links 
  Ekuanitshit on the Mamit Innuat Tribal Council's website
 First Nation Detail by Indigenous and Northern Affairs Canada

First Nations in Quebec
First Nations governments
Innu